Livio Isotti (29 June 1927 – 19 September 1999) was an Italian professional road bicycle racer from 1950 to 1955. He also competed in the individual and team road race events at the 1948 Summer Olympics.

Major results
1950
Giro della Romagna
1953
Tour de France:
Winner stage 7

References

External links 

Official Tour de France results for Livio Isotti

1927 births
1999 deaths
Italian male cyclists
Italian Tour de France stage winners
People from Pesaro
Cyclists from Marche
Olympic cyclists of Italy
Cyclists at the 1948 Summer Olympics
Sportspeople from the Province of Pesaro and Urbino